Bourlon's genet (Genetta bourloni) is a genet species native to the Upper Guinean forests. It is known from only 29 zoological specimens in natural history museum and has been described as a new Genetta species in 2003.
It is listed as Vulnerable on the IUCN Red List as the global population is estimated at less than 10,000 mature individuals.

References

Genets (animals)
Carnivorans of Africa
Mammals described in 2003